Major-General John Sydney Lethbridge CB, CBE, MC (11 December 1897 – 11 August 1961) was a British soldier.

Early life
Born in Barrackpore, India, the son of Lt-Col. Sydney Lethbridge, OBE RA and Susannah Maud Slator, Lethbridge was educated at Gresham's School, Holt, Uppingham School, Leicestershire, the Royal Military Academy, Woolwich and Jesus College, Cambridge.

Military career

Lethbridge was commissioned into the Corps of Royal Engineers in 1915 during the First World War and saw active service on the Western Front with 123 Field Company at the first battle of Ypres in 1915 and later at the Battle of the Somme in 1916 and as a temporary Captain with the King George V's Own Bengal Sappers and Miners in India in 1917 before serving with the Aden Frontier Force for operations in southern Arabia between 1917 and 1918. He commanded, as acting major, a company of King George V's Own Bengal Sappers and Miners in Afghanistan and on the North West Frontier during the Third Anglo-Afghan War from 1919 to 1922. He served again with King George V's Own Bengal Sappers and Miners at Roorkee and Rawalpindi and saw active service in Peshawar against Afridi raiders in 1930. After graduating from Staff College at Quetta in 1932 he became Superintendent of Instruction at Roorkee and was then appointed a Field Works major at Chatham in 1933. He joined the General Staff at Headquarters, Northern Command at York and then transferred to the Military Operations Branch and Directorate of Recruiting and Organisation at the War Office in 1936 before becoming an instructor at the Senior Officers' School at Sheerness in 1939.

Lethbridge served in the Second World War with British Expeditionary Force in France in 1939 before becoming Commander Royal Engineers for the 59th (Staffordshire) Infantry Division. He went on to be Deputy Director of Staff Duties at the War Office in 1940, liaison officer with US Forces in London in 1942 and leader of the 'Lethbridge Mission' to study tactics and equipment required to defeat Japan in the Far East in 1943. His last war appointment was as Chief of Staff for the 14th Army in Burma from 1944 under the command of Field Marshal Sir William Slim, later 1st Viscount Slim.

After the War Lethbridge became Chief of Intelligence for the Control Commission for Germany and British Army of the Rhine in 1945, Commandant of the Civil Defence Staff College in 1949 and Director of Civil Defence for the South West Region (Bristol) in September 1955. Lethbridge retired to Bondleigh, near North Tawton, in Devon, but died in August 1961, less than a year after his retirement.

Family
In 1925, Lethbridge married Katharine Greville Maynard, the daughter of Sir John Maynard, KCIE CSI in Shimla, India, and they had one son and two daughters.

Honours
Military Cross, 1919
Commander of the Order of the British Empire, 1942
Companion of the Order of the Bath, 1946
Commander, US Legion of Merit, 1946

References

Bibliography

External links
Generals of World War II

1897 births
1961 deaths
People educated at Gresham's School
People educated at Uppingham School
Alumni of Jesus College, Cambridge
Graduates of the Royal Military Academy, Woolwich
Royal Engineers officers
British Army generals of World War II
British Indian Army officers
Bengal Sappers and Miners personnel
British Army personnel of World War I
British Army major generals
Indian Army personnel of World War I
British military personnel of the Third Anglo-Afghan War
Recipients of the Military Cross
Companions of the Order of the Bath
Commanders of the Order of the British Empire
Commanders of the Legion of Merit
John Sydney
Military personnel of British India
Graduates of the Staff College, Quetta